Ossa de Montiel is a municipality in Albacete, Castile-La Mancha, Spain. It has a population of 2,836 (2005).

The Lagunas de Ruidera are located within this town's municipal term.

Notable people 
 Óscar Sevilla, Spanish cyclist

Municipalities of the Province of Albacete